Forward Operating Base Arnhem or more simply FOB Arnhem is a former International Security Assistance Force (ISAF) Forward operating base which was located in Nahri Saraj District, Helmand Province, Afghanistan.

History

The base was originally established by members of the Ministry of Defence and used by British units under Operation Herrick.

Units

It has been used by:
 Operation Herrick VI - 12th Mechanized Brigade (April 2007 - October 2007):
 5th Scout Squad (RDA)
 3 Company, 1st Battalion, Grenadier Guards, Operational Mentoring and Liaison Team (OMLT).
2 Platoon, Somme Coy. London Regiment
 Right Flank, 1st Battalion, Scots Guards.
 Operation Herrick VII - 52nd Infantry Brigade (October 2007 - April 2008):
 2nd Battalion, the Yorkshire Regiment OMLT.

Possibly destroyed December 2007.

See also
Operation Herrick order of battle
List of ISAF installations in Afghanistan

References

Citations

Bibliography

Buildings and structures in Helmand Province